In molecular biology mir-11 microRNA is a short RNA molecule. MicroRNAs function to regulate the expression levels of other genes by several mechanisms. There is an evidence to suggest that miR-11 plays a role in apoptosis.

Alignment has shown that miR-11 shares the same family motif as miR-2b and miR-6, together making up the mir-2 clan. There is however little similarity in the 3' ends between these clan members.

See also 
 MicroRNA

References

Further reading

External links

MicroRNA
MicroRNA precursor families